Mount Keohane is a peak immediately northwest of Lake Fryxell, rising to  between Canada Glacier and Huey Gully on the north side of Taylor Valley, in Victoria Land, Antarctica. It was named in 1997 by the Advisory Committee on Antarctic Names after Petty Officer Patrick Keohane, Royal Navy, of the British Antarctic Expedition, 1910–13. Keohane was a member of Robert F. Scott's South Pole journey support party that reached the Upper Glacier Depot on Beardmore Glacier (85°7′S 163°4′E) before returning to headquarters on Cape Evans.

References

Mountains of Victoria Land
McMurdo Dry Valleys